Scelida is a genus of skeletonizing leaf beetles in the family Chrysomelidae. There are at least four described species in Scelida. They are found in North America and the Neotropics.

Species
These four species belong to the genus Scelida:
 Scelida flaviceps (Horn, 1893)
 Scelida metallica Jacoby, 1888
 Scelida mimula
 Scelida nigricornis (Jacoby, 1888)

References

Further reading

 
 
 
 

Galerucinae
Chrysomelidae genera
Articles created by Qbugbot
Taxa named by Félicien Chapuis